The following lists are the squad list for the 2022 OFC Futsal Cup.
For the 2022 OFC Futsal Cup, the 8 participating national teams must submit squads of at least 12 players – of which 1 must be a goalkeeper.

The squads for the tournament were announced by Oceania Football Confederation on the 9 September 2022.

Group A

Head coach: Vivek Nadan

Head coach: Marvin Eakins

New Zealand's 14 man squad announced on 7 September 2022.

Head coach: Manu Tualau

Head coach: Ben Hungai

Group B

Head coach:  Jerry Sam

Head coach: Andre Hnawang

Head coach: Taumateina Tugaga

Head coach: Francis Lafai

References

2022 in futsal